Garrett Fisher (born 1970) is an American composer based in Seattle.

Works
"The Passion of Saint Thomas More" (1995) recorded BIS Records
"Moon in the Bucket," based on a 14th-century Noh play, Matsukaze
"Stargazer," based on the life of Galileo
"Dream of Zeus" 
"Silk Road" 
"Psyche," based on the Greek myth 2008
"The Passion of Saint Sebastian"
"At the Hawk's Well"

References

Garrett Fisher blog

1970 births
Living people